Per-Arne Henrik Morberg (born 23 June 1960) is a Swedish actor, chef, and TV host.

Biography
Morberg grew up in Hökarängen and Sköndal in Stockholm. He competed in judo when he was a teenager. He is a black belt and was named Swedish and Scandinavian champion. He came third at the 1977 European Cadet Championship. He trained himself as a chef in Kristineberg, attended restaurant school, and has worked as a professional chef.

After a theatre lesson at Studiefrämjandet 1982, Morberg was advised to go to stage school. He attended theatre and opera school in Gothenburg and first acted at Angered's Theatre, where he did the main role as Armand in Kameliadamen. He has toured with Riksteatern in several sets and was particularly noticed for his role as Molina in Kiss of the Spider Woman. At the Royal Dramatic Theatre Morberg has acted in several plays, including Dangerous Liaisons and August Strindberg's Miss Julie. Morberg achieved an unexpected success in a comic role in Sound of Music at Göta Lejon in 1995, where he played Maximillian Detweiller.

Morberg is well known for his role as Joakim Wersén in the Swedish crime dramas based on the character Martin Beck.

Selected filmography
Kommisarie Späck (2010)
Wallander – Vålnaden (2010)
2007+2009 – Vad blir det för mat?
Kommissarien och havet (2009)
 2007 – Upp till kamp
 2007 – Luftens helter
Historien om allt (2005)
Wallander – Mörkret (2005)
As It Is in Heaven (2004)
2003–2004 – Hem till Midgård
2003 – Talismanen
Jordgubbar med riktig mjölk (2001)
Beck – Hämndens pris (2001)
 2001 – Fru Marianne
 1998 – Zingo
Beck – Vita nätter (1998)
Beck – Öga för öga (1998)
Beck – Monstret (1998)
Beck – The Money Man (1998)
 1997 – Vita lögner
Beck – Gula spår i snön (1997)
Beck – Pensionat Pärlan (1997)
Beck – Mannen med ikonerna (1997)
Beck – Lockpojken (1997)
Kalle Blomkvist – Mästerdetektiven lever farligt (1996)
Bert: The Last Virgin (1995)
 1994 – Rederiet
 1990 – Fiendens fiende
 1989 – 1939
 1987 – Svenska hjärtan

References

External links

Interview with Per Morberg in Swedish Television, 24 August 2013 (from 05:31)

1960 births
Swedish male actors
Living people
Swedish television hosts
Swedish chefs